Proedromys is a genus of rodent in the family Cricetidae from China. It is part of the tribe Arvicolini within the subfamily Arvicolinae, which contains the voles, lemmings, and relatives.
It contains the following species:
 Duke of Bedford's vole (Proedromys bedfordi)
Liangshan vole (Proedromys liangshanensis)

References
Liu, S. Z. Sun, Z. Zeng, and E. Zhao. 2007.  A new vole (Cricetidae: Arvicolinae: Proedromys) from the Liangshan Mountains of Sichuan Province, China.  Journal of Mammalogy, 88:1170-1178.
Musser, G. G. and M. D. Carleton. 2005. Superfamily Muroidea. pp. 894–1531 in Mammal Species of the World a Taxonomic and Geographic Reference. D. E. Wilson and D. M. Reeder eds. Johns Hopkins University Press, Baltimore.

 
Rodent genera
Taxa named by Oldfield Thomas
Taxonomy articles created by Polbot